Justice Connor may refer to:

George Whitfield Connor, associate justice of the North Carolina Supreme Court
Henry G. Connor, associate justice of the North Carolina Supreme Court
Roger G. Connor, associate justice of the Alaska Supreme Court

See also
Justice O'Connor (disambiguation)